Rigoberta Menchú Tum (born 9 January 1959) is a K'iche' Guatemalan human rights activist, feminist, and Nobel Peace Prize laureate. Menchú has dedicated her life to publicizing the rights of Guatemala's Indigenous peoples during and after the Guatemalan Civil War (1960–1996), and to promoting Indigenous rights internationally.

She received the Nobel Peace Prize in 1992 and the Princess of Asturias Award in 1998, in addition to other prestigious awards. She is the subject of the testimonial biography I, Rigoberta Menchú (1983) and the author of the autobiographical work, Crossing Borders (1998), among other works. Menchú is a UNESCO Goodwill Ambassador. She ran for president of Guatemala in 2007 and 2011, having founded the country's first Indigenous political party, Winaq.

Personal life
Rigoberta Menchú was born to a poor Indigenous family of K'iche' Maya descent in Laj Chimel, a rural area in the north-central Guatemalan province of El Quiché. Her family was one of many Indigenous families who could not sustain themselves on the small pieces of land they were left with after the Spanish conquest of Guatemala. Menchú's mother began her career as a midwife at age sixteen, and continued to practice using traditional medicinal plants until she was murdered at age 43. Her father was a prominent activist for the rights of Indigenous farmers in Guatemala. Both of her parents regularly attended Catholic church, and her mother remained connected to her Maya spirituality and identity. Menchú considers herself to be the perfect mix of both her parents. She believes in many teachings of the Catholic Church, but her mother's Maya influence also taught Menchú the importance of living in harmony with nature and retaining her Maya culture.

In 1979-80 her brother, Patrocinio, and her mother, Juana Tum Kótoja, were kidnapped, brutally tortured and murdered by the Guatemalan Army. Her father, Vicente Menchú Perez, died in the 1980 Burning of the Spanish Embassy, which occurred after urban guerrillas took hostages and were attacked by government security forces. In January 2015, Pedro García Arredondo, a former police commander of the Guatemalan Army who later served as the chief of the now defunct National Police (Policía Nacional, PN), was convicted of attempted murder and crimes against humanity for his role in the embassy attack; Arrendondo was also previously convicted in 2012 of ordering the enforced disappearance of agronomy student Édgar Enrique Sáenz Calito during the country’s long-running internal armed conflict.

In 1984, Menchú's other brother, Victor, was shot to death after he surrendered to the Guatemalan Army, was threatened by soldiers, and tried to escape.

In 1995, Menchú married Ángel Canil, a Guatemalan, in a Mayan ceremony. They had a Catholic wedding in January 1998; at that time they also buried their son Tz'unun ("hummingbird" in Mayan), who had died after being born prematurely in December. They adopted a son, Mash Nahual Ja' ("Spirit of Water").

She lives with her family in the municipality of San Pedro Jocopilas, Quiché Department, northwest of Guatemala City, in the heartland of the Kʼicheʼ people.

Guatemalan activism
From a young age, Menchú was active alongside her father, advocating for the rights of Indigenous farmers through the Committee for Peasant Unity. Menchú often faced discrimination for wanting to join her male family members in the fight for justice, but she was inspired by her mother to continue making space for herself. She believes that the roots of Indigenous oppression in Guatemala stem from issues of exploitation and colonial land ownership. Her early activism focused on defending her people from colonial exploitation.

After leaving school, Menchú worked as an activist campaigning against human rights violations committed by the Guatemalan Army during the country's civil war, which lasted from 1960 to 1996. Many of the human rights violations that occurred during the war targeted Indigenous peoples. Women were targets of physical and sexual violence at the hands of the military.

In 1981, Menchú was exiled and escaped to Mexico where she found refuge in the home of a Catholic bishop in Chiapas.  Menchú continued to organize resistance to oppression in Guatemala and organize the struggle for Indigenous rights by co-founding the United Republic of Guatemalan Opposition. Tens of thousands of people, mostly Mayan Indians, fled to Mexico from 1982 to 1984 at the height of Guatemala's 36-year civil war.

A year later, in 1982, she narrated a book about her life, titled Me llamo Rigoberta Menchú y así me nació la conciencia (My Name is Rigoberta Menchú, and this is how my Awareness was Born), to Venezuelan author and anthropologist Elizabeth Burgos, which was translated into five other languages including English and French. The book made her an international icon at the time of the ongoing conflict in Guatemala and brought attention to the suffering of Indigenous peoples under an oppressive government regime.

Menchú served as the Presidential Goodwill Ambassador for the 1996 Peace Accords in Guatemala. That same year she received the Peace Abbey Courage of Conscience Award in Boston.

After the Guatemalan Civil War ended, Menchú campaigned to have Guatemalan political and military establishment members tried in Spanish courts. In 1999, she filed a complaint before a court in Spain because prosecutions of civil-war era crimes in Guatemala was practically impossible. These attempts stalled as the Spanish courts determined that the plaintiffs had not yet exhausted all possibilities of seeking justice through the legal system of Guatemala. On 23 December 2006, Spain called for the extradition from Guatemala of seven former members of Guatemala's government, including Efraín Ríos Montt and Óscar Mejía, on charges of genocide and torture. Spain's highest court ruled that cases of genocide committed abroad could be judged in Spain, even if no Spanish citizens were involved. In addition to the deaths of Spanish citizens, the most serious charges include genocide against the Maya people of Guatemala.

Politics

In 2005, Menchú joined the Guatemalan federal government as goodwill ambassador for the National Peace Accords. In April 2005, five Guatemalan politicians would be convicted for hurling racial epithets at her and also at court rulings which upheld the right to wear indigenous dress and practice Mayan spirituality.

On 12 February 2007, Menchú announced that she would form an Indigenous political party called Encuentro por Guatemala and that she would stand in the 2007 presidential election. She was the first Maya, Indigenous woman to ever run in a Guatemalan election. In the 2007 election, Menchú was defeated in the first round, receiving three percent of the vote.

In 2009, Menchú became involved in the newly founded party Winaq. Menchú was a candidate for the 2011 presidential election, but lost in the first round, winning three percent of the vote again. Although Menchú was not elected, Winaq succeeded in becoming the first Indigenous political party of Guatemala.

International activism 
In 1996, Menchú was appointed as a UNESCO Goodwill Ambassador in recognition of her activism for the rights of Indigenous people. In this capacity, she acted as a spokesperson for the first International Decade of the World's Indigenous Peoples (1995–2004), where she worked to improve international collaboration on issues such as environment, education, health care, and human rights for Indigenous peoples. In 2015, Menchú met with the general director of UNESCO, Irina Bokova, in order to solidify relations between Guatemala and the organization.

Since 2003, Menchú has become involved in the Indigenous pharmaceutical industry as president of "Salud para Todos" ("Health for All") and the company "Farmacias Similares," with the goal of offering low-cost generic medicines. As president of this organization, Menchú has received pushback from large pharmaceutical companies due to her desire to shorten the patent life of certain AIDS and cancer drugs to increase their availability and affordability.

In 2006, Menchú was one of the founders of the Nobel Women's Initiative along with sister Nobel Peace Laureates Jody Williams, Shirin Ebadi, Wangari Maathai, Betty Williams and Mairead Corrigan Maguire. These six women, representing North America, South America, Europe, the Middle East, and Africa, decided to bring together their experiences in a united effort for peace, justice and equality. It is the goal of the Nobel Women's Initiative to help strengthen women's rights around the world.

Menchú is a member of PeaceJam, an organization whose mission is to use Nobel Peace Laureates as mentors and models for young people and provide a way for these Laureates to share their knowledge, passions, and experience. She travels around the world speaking to youth through PeaceJam conferences. She has also been a member of the Foundation Chirac's honor committee since the foundation was launched in 2008 by former French president Jacques Chirac in order to promote world peace.

Menchú has continued her activism by continuing to raise awareness for issues including political and economic inequality and climate change.

Legacy

Awards and honors

 1992 Nobel Peace Prize for her advocacy and social justice work for the indigenous peoples of Latin America
 1992 UNESCO Goodwill Ambassador position for her advocacy for the indigenous peoples of Guatemala
 Menchú became the youngest recipient of the Nobel Peace Prize at the time, and its first Indigenous recipient.
 1996 Peace Abbey Courage of Conscience Award for her authorship and advocacy for the indigenous peoples of Guatemala
 1998 Prince of Asturias Prize for improving the condition of women and the communities they serve. (Jointly with 6 other women.)
 1999 asteroid 9481 Menchú was named in her honor
 2010 Order of the Aztec Eagle for services provided for Mexico
 2018 Spendlove Prize for her advocacy for minority groups
 In 2022, the University of Bordeaux Montaigne, located in Pessac gave the name of its newly built library in her honor

Publications 
 I, Rigoberta Menchú (1983)
 This book, also titled My Name is Rigoberta Menchú and that's how my Conscience was Born, was dictated by Menchú and transcribed by Elizabeth Burgos
 Crossing Borders (1998)
 Daughter of the Maya (1999)
 The Girl from Chimel (2005) with Dante Liano, illustrated by Domi 
 The Honey Jar (2006) with Dante Liano, illustrated by Domi
 The Secret Legacy (2008) with Dante Liano, illustrated by Domi 
 K'aslemalil-Vivir. El caminar de Rigoberta Menchú Tum en el Tiempo (2012)

Controversies about her testimony
More than a decade after the publication of I, Rigoberta Menchú, anthropologist David Stoll investigated Menchú's story and claimed that Menchú changed some elements about her life, family, and village to meet the publicity needs of the guerrilla movement. The controversy caused by Stoll's book received widespread coverage in the US press of the time; thus the New York Times highlighted a few claims in her book contradicted by other sources:

Many authors have defended Menchú, and attributed the controversy to different interpretations of the testimonio genre. Menchú herself states,  "I'd like to stress that it's not only my life, it's also the testimony of my people." Some scholars have stated that, despite its factual and historical inaccuracies, Menchú's testimony remains relevant for the ways in which it depicts the life of an Indigenous Guatemalan during the civil war.

The Nobel Committee dismissed calls to revoke Menchú's Nobel Prize, in spite of Stoll's allegations regarding Menchú. Geir Lundestad, the secretary of the committee, stated that Menchú's prize was awarded because of her advocacy and social justice work, not because of her testimony, and that she had committed no observable wrongdoing.

According to Mark Horowitz, William Yaworsky, and Kenneth Kickham, the controversy about Stoll's account of Menchu is one of the three most divisive episodes in recent American anthropological history, along with controversies about the truthfulness of Margaret Mead's Coming of Age in Samoa and Napoleon Chagnon's representation of violence among the Yanomami.

See also

 List of civil rights leaders
 List of peace activists
 List of female Nobel laureates
 List of feminists

References

Bibliography
 Ament, Gail. "Recent Maya Incursions into Guatemalan Literary Historiography". Literary Cultures of Latin America: A Comparative History. Eds. Mario J. Valdés & Djelal Kadir. 3 Vols. Vol 1: Configurations of Literary Culture. Oxford: Oxford University Press, 2004: I: 216–215.
 Arias, Arturo. "After the Rigoberta Menchú Controversy: Lessons Learned About the Nature of Subalternity and the Specifics of the Indigenous Subject" MLN 117.2 (2002): 481–505.
 Beverley, John. "The Real Thing (Our Rigoberta)" Modern Language Quarterly 57:2 (June 1996): 129–235.
 Brittin, Alice A. "Close Encounters of the Third World Kind: Rigoberta Menchu and Elisabeth Burgos's Me llamo Rigoberta Menchu". Latin American Perspectives, Vol. 22, No. 4, Redefining Democracy: Cuba and Chiapas (Autumn, 1995), pp. 100–114.
 De Valdés, María Elena. "The Discourse of the Other: Testimonio and the Fiction of the Maya." Bulletin of Hispanic Studies (Liverpool), LXXIII (1996): 79–90.
 Feal, Rosemary Geisdorfer. "Women Writers into the Mainstream: Contemporary Latin American Narrative". Philosophy and Literature in Latin America. Eds. Jorge J.E. Gracia and Mireya Camurati. New York: State University of New York, 1989. An overview of women in contemporary Latin American letters.
 Golden, Tim. "Guatemalan Indian Wins the Nobel Peace Prize": New York Times (17 October 1992): p. A1, A5.
 Golden, Tim. "Guatemalan to Fight on With Nobel as Trumpet": New York Times (19 October 1992): p.A5.
 Gossen, Gary H. "Rigoberta Menchu and Her Epic Narrative". Latin American Perspectives, Vol. 26, No. 6, If Truth Be Told: A Forum on David Stoll's "Rigoberta Menchu and the Story of All Poor Guatemalans" (Nov., 1999), pp. 64–69.
 Gray Díaz, Nancy. "Indian Women Writers of Spanish America". Spanish American Women Writers: A Bio-Bibliographical Source Book. Ed. Diane E. Marting. New York: Greenwood Press, 1988
 Millay, Amy Nauss. Voices from the Fuente Viva: The Effect of Orality in Twentieth-Century Spanish American Narrative. Lewisburg: Bucknell University Press, 2005.
 Logan, Kathleen. "Personal Testimony: Latin American Women Telling Their Lives". Latin American Research Review 32.1 (1997): 199–211. Review Essay.
 Nelan, Bruce W. "Striking Against Racism". Time 140:61 (26 October 1992): p. 61.
 Stanford, Victoria. "Between Rigoberta Menchu and La Violencia: Deconstructing David Stoll's History of Guatemala" Latin American Perspectives 26.6, If Truth Be Told: A Forum on David Stoll's "Rigoberta Menchu and the Story of All Poor Guatemalans" (Nov., 1999), pp. 38–46.
 ---. "From I, Rigoberta to the Commissioning of Truth Maya Women and the Reshaping of Guatemalan History". Cultural Critique 47 (2001) 16–53.
 Sommer, Doris. "Rigoberta's Secrets" Latin American Perspectives, Vol. 18, No. 3, Voices of the Voiceless in Testimonial Literature, Part I. (Summer, 1991), pp. 32–50.
 Stoll, David "Rigoberta Menchu and the Story of All Poor Guatemalans" (Westview Press, 1999)
 ---. "Slaps and Embraces: A Rhetoric of Particularism". The Latin American Subaltern Studies Reader. Ed. Iliana Rodríguez. Durham: Duke University Press, 2001.
 Wise, R. Todd. "Native American Testimonio: The Shared Vision of Black Elk and Rigoberta Menchú". In Christianity and Literature, Volume 45, Issue No.1 (Autumn 1995).
 Zimmerman, Marc. "Rigoberta Menchú After the Nobel: From Militant Narrative to Postmodern Politics". The Latin American Subaltern Studies Reader. Durham: Duke University Press, 2001.

External links

 
 Salon.com: Rigoberta Menchú meets the press
 New York Times: TARNISHED LAUREATE: A special report.; Nobel Winner Finds Her Story Challenged, 15 December 1998
 New York Times: Guatemala Laureate Defends 'My Truth' 21 January 1999
 "Peace Prize Winner Admits Discrepancies", AP story in New York Times, 12 February 1999 (Subscription only.)
 "Spain may judge Guatemala abuses", BBC News, 5 October 2005
 "Anthropologist Challenges Veracity of Multicultural Icon" – The Chronicle of Higher Education. (Subscription only.)
 
 Sound recording of Elizabeth Burgos-Debray interviewing Rigoberta Menchu.
 

Guatemalan activists
Guatemalan indigenous rights activists
Women human rights activists
Nobel Peace Prize laureates
Guatemalan Nobel laureates
Women Nobel laureates
Women autobiographers
1959 births
Living people
People of the Guatemalan Civil War
Nonviolence advocates
20th-century Guatemalan women politicians
20th-century Guatemalan politicians
Guatemalan Maya people
Guatemalan women activists
Indigenous activists of the Americas
Indigenous writers of the Americas
Encuentro por Guatemala politicians
Winaq politicians
People from Quiché Department
Women in war in Central America
Women in warfare post-1945
20th-century Guatemalan writers
21st-century Guatemalan writers
K'iche'
Autobiographers
21st-century Guatemalan women politicians
21st-century Guatemalan politicians
20th-century Guatemalan women writers
UNESCO Goodwill Ambassadors
Indigenous feminists
Feminism and history
Guatemalan feminists
Indigenous rights
Indigenous rights activists
Guatemalan socialists
John is gau